Shiono (written: 塩野 lit. "salt field") is a Japanese surname. Notable people with the surname include:

, Japanese actor and model
, Japanese voice actress
, Japanese manga artist
, Japanese writer
, Japanese lawyer and politician

Japanese-language surnames